Eirini Karastergiou (born November 20, 1982) is a Greek former swimmer, who specialized in backstroke events. She previously held two Greek records in both 100 and 200 m backstroke, until they were all broken each by Aspasia Petradaki and Stella Boumi in 2009.

Karastergiou qualified for two swimming events at the 2004 Summer Olympics in Athens, representing the host nation Greece. She cleared FINA B-standard entry times of 1:03.26 (100 m backstroke) and 2:14.82 (200 m backstroke) from the Greek Open in Piraeus. In the 100 m backstroke, Karastergiou challenged seven other swimmers in heat three, including top medal favorite Kirsty Coventry of Zimbabwe. She edged out Finland's Hanna-Maria Seppälä to take a seventh spot and thirty-third overall by a quarter of a second (0.25) in 1:05.30. In the 200 m backstroke, Karastergiou placed thirtieth in the morning prelims. Swimming in heat two, she rounded out a field of eight swimmers to last place by less than 0.18 of a second behind Thailand's Chonlathorn Vorathamrong in 2:21.93.

References

External links
2004 Olympic Profile – Eideisis Ellinika 

1982 births
Living people
Greek female swimmers
Olympic swimmers of Greece
Swimmers at the 2004 Summer Olympics
Female backstroke swimmers
Sportspeople from Lamia (city)